Elections in the Russian Federation  took place mostly on 9, 16 and 23 September, with the exception of the presidential election, which occurred on 18 March and a special gubernatorial election in Primorsky Krai, which occurred in December.

Overview

Presidential election

The presidential elections were held on 18 March.

By-elections to the State Duma

The by-elections in four constituencies took place on a single voting day on 9 September:
2018 Saratov by-election
2018 Zavolzhsky by-election
2018 Balashov by-election
2018 Nizhny Novgorod by-election

Gubernatorial and head elections

Gubernatorial elections in 19 subjects of the Federation were held on 9 September. The second round, if necessary, will be held on September 23.

Direct elections
2018 Altai Krai gubernatorial elections
2018 Samara Oblast gubernatorial election
2018 Nizhny Novgorod Oblast gubernatorial election
2018 Krasnoyarsk Krai gubernatorial election
September 2018 Primorsky Krai gubernatorial election (election result was cancelled and new elections were scheduled)
December 2018 Primorsky Krai gubernatorial election
2018 Oryol Oblast gubernatorial election
2018 Novosibirsk Oblast gubernatorial election
2018 Omsk Oblast gubernatorial election
2018 Ivanovo Oblast gubernatorial election
2018 Pskov Oblast gubernatorial election
2018 Moscow Oblast gubernatorial election
2018 Khakas head election
2018 Magadan Oblast gubernatorial election
2018 Vladimir Oblast gubernatorial election
2018 Khabarovsk Krai gubernatorial election
2018 Moscow mayoral election
2018 Chukotka Autonomous Okrug gubernatorial election
2018 Voronezh Oblast gubernatorial election
2018 Kemerovo Oblast gubernatorial election

Indirect elections
2018 Nenets gubernatorial election
2018 Dagestani head election
2018 Ingush head election

Regional elections

Autonomous republics and okrugs 
2018 Bashkir parliamentary election
2018 Buryat parliamentary election
2018 Kalmyk parliamentary election
2018 Sakha parliamentary election
2018 Khakas parliamentary election
2018 Nenets parliamentary election

Oblasts and krais 
2018 Zabaikalsky Krai Legislative Assembly election
2018 Arkhangelsk Oblast Assembly of Deputies election
2018 Vladimir Oblast Legislative Assembly election
2018 Ivanovo Oblast Duma election
2018 Irkutsk Oblast Legislative Assembly election
2018 Kemerovo Oblast Council of People's Deputies election
2018 Rostov Oblast Legislative Assembly election
2018 Smolensk Oblast Duma election
2018 Ulyanovsk Oblast Legislative Assembly election
2018 Yaroslavl Oblast Duma election

Regional referendums
The referendum was held on 18 March.
2018 Volgograd Oblast time zone referendum

References

 
Regional elections in Russia